The 1913 Wisconsin Badgers football team represented the University of Wisconsin as a member of the Western Conference during the 1913 college football season. Led second-year head coach William Juneau, the Badgers compiled an overall record of 3–3–1 with a mark of 1–2–1 in conference play, placing sixth in the Western Conference. The team's captain was Alvin Tandberg.

Schedule

References

Wisconsin
Wisconsin Badgers football seasons
Wisconsin Badgers football